Menace is a horizontally scrolling shooter developed by DMA Design and published by Psygnosis. It was originally released for the Amiga in 1988, and was ported for the Atari ST, Commodore 64, and MS-DOS in 1989. The game is set on the planet of Draconia, where players are tasked with destroying the planet's defence mechanisms in order to kill the harmful creatures.

The game was designed by David Jones, and was the first game developed by his company DMA Design. First developed in his bedroom at his parents' house, Jones began seeking an official development studio and publisher when the game was nearing completion. He eventually settled upon a publishing deal with Psygnosis, who first published the game in 1988 to positive reviews; praise was given to the game's graphics, sound and gameplay, while criticism was directed at its ports to inferior hardware. The game was commercially successful, selling over 20,000 copies.

Gameplay

The player controls an alien space fighter, moving through six stages on the planet of Draconia to advance through the game. Players use the ship's weaponry—lasers and cannons—to attack all advancing enemies, and defeat the level's boss: a guardian of Draconia. The six bosses act as Draconia's living defence mechanisms—the planet was created to habituate gruesome and harmful creatures, of which there are over sixty, participating in unlawful tasks. In the game's levels, players discover space debris, which can be converted into upgrades for the ship. The debris appears as tokens, and grants players additional weapons and upgrades, such as lasers, cannons, and improved ship and weapon power. The ship also has a shield, which provides temporary protection from enemies; contact with enemies and walls depletes the shields, increasing players' vulnerability to death.

Development 
DMA Design was founded in 1987 by David Jones, Russell Kay, Steve Hammond and Mike Dailly, in Dundee, Scotland. Originally working under the name Acme Software, they began developing games for the Commodore 64 and Amiga. Jones began developing Menace under the working title CopperCon1, in his bedroom at his parents' house. He was attending the Dundee Institute of Technology at the time. To publish the game in 1988, Jones first approached Hewson Consultants, where Andrew Braybrook played the game and recommended it to Hewson. When Jones was informed that Hewson wanted the game to be the "Amiga version of Zynaps", he realised that sales would be limited, and refused to sign the contract; despite this, Hewson had already promoted the game in Popular Computing Weekly, before the deal was officially dropped. After signing a publishing deal with Psygnosis, Acme Software was renamed DMA Design.

Tony Smith worked on some of the game's backgrounds and graphics, while Jones designed the levels. Jones decided for Menace to be a side-scrolling game after playing arcade games such as Nemesis (1985) and R-Type (1987). Psygnosis could not decide a preference for the design of the player ship; as a result, Smith often re-designed the ship with many variations.
The team found difficulty porting the game to the Atari ST, due to the hardware's limitations with smooth scrolling. Brian "Biscuit" Watson, who the team met at a computer club in 1984, discovered a technique to overcome this difficulty. Other limitations included the fewer colours available with the hardware; Smith adapted his designs accordingly. After completing his own game, Kay was assigned to port Menace to PC. During development, the sound effects were temporarily replaced with those from Salamander (1986); Jones recorded the sound effects from the game, as Hammond and Dailly played. Prior to this, the temporary sound effects consisted of noises by Jones. The game's final sound effects were designed by musician David Whittaker. The cover art was designed by Ian Craig. At the end of development, the game was known as Draconia, before being renamed to Menace shortly before release, upon discovering that another game had the same title.

Reception 

The game received mostly positive reviews from critics upon release, particularly for its gameplay, graphical design, and sound. Criticism was also directed at the game's ports, and the limitations met with the inferior hardware. Jason Holborn of ST/Amiga Format wrote that the game "provides some of the best arcade action" in an Amiga game. The game generated a considerable amount of money for DMA Design, allowing the company to develop more games. The game sold 20,000 copies, reportedly generating around £20,000.

Holborn of ST/Amiga Format called the gameplay "exceptional" and "addictive", stating that players will be "hooked for hours on end". Ciaran Brennan of Computer and Video Games praised its replayability, writing that it has "enough depth built in to make it last". Conversely, Zzap!64s Kati Hamza wrote that the gameplay is "rather poor", disliking the pace and level design, and Maff Evans in the same review called it "dull and unrewarding", pointing out the lack of excitement and reward. The Games Machine condemned the "jerky scrolling" of the PC version, while Rod Lawton of ACE called the gameplay of the Amiga version "stubbornly 8-bit".

The game's graphics received positive reactions. Lawton of ACE called them "attractive", and Holborn of ST/Amiga Format named them "beautifully stomach churning", calling Menace "one of the best presented games available". While Zzap!64s Hamza felt that the Amiga version was "blessed with nice graphics", she wrote that the Commodore 64 version has "surprisingly weak presentation"; Evans similarly called the graphics "half-baked". The Games Machine was disappointed by the graphics, particularly identifying the limited colour capabilities of the Atari ST version.

Reviewers praised the game's use of sound. ST/Amiga Formats Holborn lauded the soundtrack's appropriation to gameplay, calling it "brilliant", and writing that the game's speech and sound effects enhance the feel of the game. The Games Machine favourably compared the soundtrack to Xenon (1988); however, it noted that the sounds in the Atari ST version are "less clear", and the PC sound effects are "pathetic". Zzap!64 called the soundtrack "average", and wrote that the "pathetic [sound] effects add little atmosphere".

References 

1988 video games
Amiga games
Atari ST games
Commodore 64 games
DOS games
Horizontally scrolling shooters
Video games scored by David Whittaker
Video games set on fictional planets
Psygnosis games
DMA Design games
Single-player video games
Video games developed in the United Kingdom